Jakub Orsava (born February 27, 1991) is a Czech hockey player, who currently plays for HC Kometa Brno in the Czech Extraliga (ELH). He made his professional debut with HC Oceláři Třinec in the 2009–10 season.

References

External links

1991 births
Living people
HC Benátky nad Jizerou players
BK Mladá Boleslav players
Czech ice hockey forwards
HC Dynamo Pardubice players
HC Kometa Brno players
HC Oceláři Třinec players
Orli Znojmo players
Piráti Chomutov players
People from Šumperk
Sportspeople from the Olomouc Region